The former Middlesex Sessions House or the Old Sessions House is a large building on Clerkenwell Green in the London Borough of Islington in London, England, built in 1780 as the courthouse for the Middlesex Quarter Sessions. It is a Grade II* listed building.

History

The building was commissioned to replace Hicks Hall as the courthouse for the Middlesex Quarter Sessions: Hicks Hall had opened in 1612 and had stepped into many of the lesser functions of the Old Bailey before being demolished in 1782.

The Sessions House was designed by Thomas Rogers in the classical style and completed in 1782. It served as the main judicial and administrative centre of Middlesex until county councils were created for Middlesex and London in 1889. At that point the Middlesex county leaders had no further use for the Sessions House because it was physically in the County of London rather than in Middlesex. Administrative matters relating to the county of Middlesex were immediately transferred to the Guildhall in Parliament Square. London County Council took over management of the Sessions House and continued to use it temporarily for magistrates' courts in its area. However, all remaining judicial business was transferred to the Sessions House in Newington Causeway in 1921.

From 1931 to 1973 the former Middlesex Sessions House served as the headquarters of Avery Weighing Machines, manufacturers of weighing-machines and scales. After that company's departure, the building fell into further disrepair until, in 1978, it was acquired and restored by a masonic trust and the following year opened as the London Masonic Centre, incorporating conference and social facilities.

In 2013 it was reported that the proprietors of Home House, a private members' club in London's West End, were in negotiations to acquire the building for use as a Clerkenwell Club. However, in 2014, the building was actually acquired by Oliver and Ted Grebelius of Sätila Studios, who converted it into a restaurant and bar.

Architecture
The Sessions House is substantially larger than Hicks Hall and was built in the classical style with four huge Ionic order columns supporting a pediment. In contrast with the modest sessions houses of earlier days, the new Middlesex Sessions House, designed by Thomas Rogers, was built with imperial grandeur in its proportions and decoration. It was enlarged, and remodelled on all but the main front by Frederick Hyde Pownall in 1860. Above the central window was a relief of the head of King George III carved by John Charles Felix Rossi and Giovanni Battista Locatelli.

The dome which covers its entrance hall and staircase is a copy of that of the Pantheon in Rome.

References

Buildings and structures in Clerkenwell
History of local government in Middlesex
History of the London Borough of Islington
Court buildings in England
Grade II* listed buildings in the London Borough of Islington